Freedom of religion in Afghanistan changed during the Islamic Republic installed in 2002 following a U.S.-led invasion that displaced the former Taliban government. The initial three articles of the Constitution of Afghanistan dated January 23, 2004, mandated:

 Afghanistan shall be an Islamic Republic, independent, unitary, and indivisible state.
 The sacred religion of Islam shall be the religion of the Islamic Republic of Afghanistan. Followers of other faiths shall be free within the bounds of law in the exercise and performance of their religious rights.
 No law shall contravene the tenets and provisions of the holy religion of Islam in Afghanistan.

Article seven of the constitution commits the state to abide by the Universal Declaration of Human Rights (UDHR) and other international treaties and conventions to which the country is a party. Articles 18 and 19 of the UDHR, taken together, effectively declare that it is a universal human right to engage in religious proselytism.

In the past, small communities of Hindus, Sikhs, Jews, and Christians also lived in the country; most members of these communities have left. Even at their peak, these non-Muslim minorities constituted only one percent of the population. Almost all members of the country's small Hindu and Sikh population, which once numbered about 50,000, have emigrated or taken refuge abroad. Non-Muslims such as Hindus and Sikhs now number only in the hundreds, often working as traders. The few Christians and Jews who live in the country are mostly foreigners who are in the country to carry out relief work on behalf of foreign non-governmental organizations (NGOs).

History
The Taliban imposed its interpretation of Islamic law, establishing a "Ministry for the Promotion of Virtue and the Prevention of Vice" for purposes of enforcement. One of the Ministry's duties was to operate a body of religious police who enforced edicts on dress code, employment, access to medical care, behavior, religious practice, and expression. Persons found to be in violation of an edict were often subject to punishment meted out on the spot, which included beatings and detention.

The Taliban persecuted members of other Islamic sects as well as non-Muslims. Traditionally, Sunni Islam of the Hanafi school of jurisprudence has been the dominant form of Islam in Afghanistan. This school counts the Taliban among its followers. The Deoband madrassa (religious school) near Delhi, India, has been a source of influence for these Sunni for approximately 200 years. Most of the Taliban leadership attended Deobandi-influenced seminaries in Pakistan. The Deoband school has long sought to "purify" Islam by discarding supposedly un-Islamic accretions to the faith and reemphasizing the models established in the Qur'an and Hadith. Deobandi scholars often have opposed what they perceive as Western influences. Much of the population adheres to Deobandi-influenced Hanafi Sunnism, but a sizable minority adheres to a more mystical version of Hanafi Sunnism generally known as Sufism. Sufism centers on orders or brotherhoods that follow charismatic religious leaders.

The Shi'a, under the Taliban, were among the most economically disadvantaged groups in the country. An ethnic group known as the Hazara is predominantly Shi'a Muslim. There also are small numbers of Ismailis living in the central and northern parts of the country. Ismailis are Shi'a Muslims, but consider the Aga Khan their spiritual leader.

Freedom of speech, including on religious matters
In March 2015, a 27-year-old Afghan woman was murdered by a mob in Kabul over false allegations of burning a copy of the Qur’an. After beating and kicking Farkhunda, the mob threw her over a bridge, set her body on fire and threw it in the river.

The Taliban prohibited free speech about religious issues or discussions that challenge orthodox Sunni Muslim views. Publishing and distribution of literature of any kind, including religious material, was rare. In 1998, television sets, videocassette recorders, videocassettes, audiocassettes, and satellite dishes were outlawed in order to enforce the prohibition. However, subsequent reports indicated that many persons in urban areas around the country continued to own such electronic devices despite the ban. The Taliban continues to prohibit music, movies, and television on religious grounds in areas that it still holds.

Religious discrimination

Discrimination against non-Muslims

According to Human Rights Watch (HRW), in September 1998, the Taliban issued decrees that forbade non-Muslims from building places of worship but allowed them to worship at existing holy sites, forbade non-Muslims from criticizing Muslims, ordered non-Muslims to identify their houses by placing a yellow cloth on their rooftops, forbade non-Muslims from living in the same residence as Muslims, and required that non-Muslim women wear a yellow dress with a special mark so that Muslims could keep their distance.

The constitution limits the political rights of Afghanistan's non-Muslims, and only Muslims are allowed to become the President.

Discrimination against Sikhs
In May 2001, according to news reports, the Taliban considered an edict requiring Sikhs to wear identifying badges on their clothing. On May 23, 2001, Taliban radio announced that the edict was approved by religious officials. However, Mullah Omar reportedly did not sign the edict and it was not implemented by the Taliban. The Taliban claim was that the proposed edict would protect Sikh citizens from harassment by members of the religious police. International observers regarded the proposed edict as part of the Taliban's efforts to segregate and isolate non-Muslim citizens, and to encourage more Sikh emigration. The reaction of Sikh citizens reportedly ranged from indifference to outrage.

Discrimination against Hazara Shia Muslims
Repression by the Taliban of the Hazara ethnic group, which is predominantly Shia Muslim, was particularly severe. Although the conflict between the Hazaras and the Taliban was political and military as well as religious, and it is not possible to state with certainty that the Taliban engaged in its campaign against the Shi'a solely because of their religious beliefs, the religious affiliation of the Hazaras apparently was a significant factor leading to their repression.

The Taliban have been accused of committing mass killings of the Hazaras particularly in the north. It has been claimed that the Taliban massacred thousands of civilians and prisoners during and after the capture of Mazar-i-Sharif in August 1998; this massacre reportedly was aimed at ethnic Hazaras. In September 1998, approximately 500 persons were killed as the Taliban gained control of the city of Bamiyan. The Hazaras regained control of Bamiyan in April 1999 following prolonged guerilla-style warfare; however, the Taliban recaptured Bamiyan in May 1999 and reportedly killed a number of Shi'a residents.

In January 2001, several NGO's reported that the Taliban massacred several hundred Shi'a civilians in Yakaolang in the center of the country. The massacre reportedly occurred after the Taliban recaptured the area from opposition forces. According to witnesses interviewed by HRW, after the Taliban recaptured the area, they rounded up victims from the surrounding villages, and shot or stabbed them with bayonets in the town center.

Besides claims of genocide, there are claims of forced expulsions of ethnic Hazaras and Tajiks from areas controlled or conquered by the Taliban, as well as harassment of these minorities throughout Taliban-controlled areas.

Freedom to proselytize
A small number of foreign Christian groups were allowed in the country to provide humanitarian assistance; however, they were forbidden by the Taliban to proselytize. A June 2001 decree stated that proselytizing by non-Muslims was punishable by death or deportation in the case of foreigners. Taliban officials subsequently stated that the decree was only a guideline.

On August 3, 2001, Dayna Curry and Heather Mercer were arrested by the Taliban along with 22 others for their work with Shelter Now, a Christian aid organization based in Germany. The Taliban also seized Bibles and videos and audio tapes from the members of the group. The workers were tried for violating the Taliban prohibition against proselytizing. On November 15, 2001, Dayna Curry and Heather Mercer were freed by Operation Enduring Freedom forces, after the Taliban had fled Kabul.

Freedom to practice a religion
Prayer was mandatory for all, and those found not praying at appointed times or who were late attending prayer were punished, often by severe beatings. There were reports in 1998 that Ministry members in Kabul stopped persons on the street and demanded that they recite various Koranic prayers in order to determine the extent of their religious knowledge.

Destruction of Buddha statues 
In March 2001, the Taliban destroyed two giant pre-Islamic Buddha statues carved into cliffs in Bamiyan province, on the grounds that statues were idolatrous. The Taliban destroyed the statues despite appeals from the United Nations, international NGOs, and the world community, including many Muslim countries, to preserve the two-thousand-year-old statues.

See also

Religion in Afghanistan
Human rights in Afghanistan
Abdul Rahman (convert)

References

Afghanistan
Religion in Afghanistan
Human rights in Afghanistan